Forex Stadium is a multi-use stadium in Braşov, Romania. It is currently used mostly for football matches and was the home ground of Tractorul Braşov and Forex Braşov. The stadium holds 5,000 people. In the past it was called Tractorul Stadium.

Forex
Buildings and structures in Brașov
Sport in Brașov